Treosulfan, sold under the brand name Trecondi, is a medication given to people before they have a bone marrow transplant from a donor known as allogeneic hematopoietic stem cell transplantation. It is used as a 'conditioning' treatment to clear the bone marrow and make room for the transplanted bone marrow cells, which can then produce healthy blood cells. It is used together with another medicine called fludarabine in adults and children from one month of age with blood cancers as well as in adults with other severe disorders requiring a bone marrow transplant.

It belongs to the family of drugs called alkylating agents. In the body, treosulfan is converted into other compounds called epoxides which kill cells, especially cells that develop rapidly such as bone marrow cells, by attaching to their DNA while they are dividing.

The most common side effects in adults and children are infections, nausea (feeling sick), stomatitis (inflammation of the lining of the mouth), vomiting, diarrhoea and abdominal pain (belly ache). Tiredness, febrile neutropenia (low white blood cell counts with fever) and high blood levels of bilirubin (a breakdown product of red blood cells) are also seen in more than 1 in 10 adults, and rash also affects more than 1 in 10 children.

Medical Uses
Treosulfan in combination with fludarabine is indicated as part of conditioning treatment prior to allogeneic haematopoietic stem cell transplantation (alloHSCT) in adults with malignant and non malignant diseases, and in children older than one month with malignant diseases.

History
Treosulfan was approved for use in the European Union in June 2019.

Two main studies showed that treosulfan is at least as effective as busulfan, another medicine used to prepare patients for haematopoietic stem cell transplantation.

In one of the studies, involving 570 adults with acute myeloid leukaemia (a blood cancer) or myelodysplastic syndromes (conditions in which large numbers of abnormal blood cells are produced), 64% of patients given treosulfan (with fludarabine) had a successful transplant and were alive and disease-free after 2 years, compared with 51% of patients given busulfan (with fludarabine).

In an additional study in 70 children with blood cancers, 99% of children given treosulfan (with fludarabine) were alive 3 months after their transplant.

On 23 February 2004, orphan designation (EU/3/04/186) was granted by the European Commission to medac Gesellschaft fuer klinische Spezialpräparate mbH, Germany, for treosulfan for the conditioning treatment prior to haematopoietic progenitor cell transplantation.

References

Further reading

External links
 
 

Alkylsulfonates
IARC Group 1 carcinogens
Alkylating antineoplastic agents
Mesylate esters
Orphan drugs
Vicinal diols